Paraseison is a monotypic genus of rotifers belonging to the family Seisonidae. The only species is Paraseison annulatus.

The species is found in Europe and Northern America.

References

Pararotatoria
Rotifer genera
Monotypic animal genera